Chelton may refer to:

 Chelton Beach Provincial Park, Prince Edward Island, Canada
 Chelton Flight Systems, American business corporation
 Chelton Linger (born 1988), Dutch footballer 
 Tsilla Chelton (1919–2012), French actress